Bottle Boys is a British sitcom which ran for two series on ITV between 1 September 1984 and 24 August 1985. Starring Robin Askwith as football-mad milkman Dave Deacon, the series mined broad comedy from randy Dave's amorous adventures.

However, as well as the sexual innuendo of his earlier big-screen adventures, Askwith was equally likely to find himself embroiled in more off-the-wall exploits, and found himself at various points in the series dressing up as a cow, inadvertently engaged to Sharon the secretary, and meeting then-Prime Minister Margaret Thatcher (played by an actor).

The part of Dave Deacon was originally written for Jim Davidson, who was by this time moving into sitcom with Up the Elephant and Round the Castle, also on ITV. Future BBC controller John Birt, during his tenure at London Weekend Television, suggested that Askwith take the part.

Critical reception
The series has a reputation as one of the worst British sitcoms ever produced. Mark Lewisohn, writing in the Radio Times Guide to Comedy observes that "ITV sitcoms had often plumbed the depths, but this was the limit", and also observed that Bottle Boys was reputedly despised by comedy executives at ITV. He described Bottle Boys as his "worst ever" British sitcom.

Writer Vince Powell was no stranger to working on shows that attracted a bad press, however, having created two of the most controversial comedy shows of the 1970s: Love Thy Neighbour and Mind Your Language.

The programme also made number 97 in Channel Four's 100 Greatest TV Moments from Hell list show, a retrospective of television's low points of the last fifty years.

Cast

 Robin Askwith – Dave Deacon
 David Auker – Billy Watson
 Oscar James – Joe Phillips
 Phil McCall – Jock Collins
 Richard Davies – Stan Evans
 Eve Ferret – Sharon Armstrong
 Patrick Newell – Mr Dawson
 Leo Dolan – Wilf Foley
 Ann Michelle (one episode)
 Zara Nutley (one episode)
 Alan Gear (one episode)
 Candy Davis (one episode)
 Pam St. Clement (one episode)
 Don Henderson (one episode)
 Bernie Winters – himself (one episode)

Episodes

Series One (1 Sep – 6 Oct 1984):

Fools Rush In
God Save Our Dairy
Danger Women at Work
All in a Day's Work
One Good Turn
Here Comes the Groom

Series Two (13 July – 24 Aug 1985)

Things That Go Bump in the Night
I Gotta Horse
Out of the Frying Pan
If the Cap Fits
High Noon
I Love Paris
The Milk Cup Runneth Over

References

External links

Bottle Boys episode guide on ComedySeries.info

1984 British television series debuts
1985 British television series endings
1980s British sitcoms
ITV sitcoms
Television series by ITV Studios
London Weekend Television shows
English-language television shows
Television shows set in London